Aldinger is a surname. Notable people with the surname include:

Albert K. Aldinger (1873–1957), American football, basketball, and baseball player and coach
Fritz Aldinger (born 1941), German materials scientist
Heinz Aldinger (born 1933), German football referee
William F. Aldinger III (born 1947), American businessman